Strophanthus preussii, the Preuss' strophanthus, is a plant in the dogbane family Apocynaceae.

Description
Its fragrant flowers feature a white to orange corolla, red-striped or spotted on the inside. Corollas have very long tails. Other vernacular names for the plant include "spider tresses" and "poison arrow vine".

Distribution and habitat
Strophanthus preussii is native to west and central tropical Africa. Its habitat is forested areas from sea level to  altitude.

Uses
Traditional medicinal uses of Strophanthus preussii include treatment of gonorrhoea and healing of sores. The plant has also been used as arrow poison.

Gallery

References

preussii
Plants used in traditional African medicine
Flora of West Tropical Africa
Flora of West-Central Tropical Africa
Flora of East Tropical Africa
Flora of Angola
Plants described in 1892